This is a list of notable Azerbaijani writers.

A 
 Chingiz Abdullayev
 Ilyas Afandiyev
 Mirza Fatali Akhundov
 Suleyman Sani Akhundov
 Ashig Alasgar

B 
 Vidadi Babanli
 Abbasgulu Bakikhanov
 Banine

C
 Yusif Vazir Chamanzaminli

E 
 Elchin Efendiyev

F 
 Fazli
 Fuzuli

G 
 Ali Gafarov

H 
 Habibi
 Hidayat
 Mehdi Huseyn

I 
 Mirza Ibrahimov
 Agalar Idrisoglu
 Hamlet Isakhanli

J 
 Jafar Jabbarly
 Huseyn Javid
 Ahmad Javad

K 
 Ali Karim
 Firidun bey Kocharli
 Kamran Nazirli

M 
 Afag Masud
 Jalil Mammadguluzadeh
 Mikayil Mushfig
 Mirza Ali Khan La'li

N 
 Nariman Narimanov
 Imadaddin Nasimi
 Khurshidbanu Natavan
 Mir Mohsun Navvab
 Sevinj Nurugizi
 Davud Nasib

O 
 Mammed Said Ordubadi

P 
 Mir Jalal Pashayev

R 
 Nigar Rafibeyli
 Natig Rasulzadeh
 Suleyman Rustam
 Rasul Rza
 Anar Rzayev

S 
 Mirza Alakbar Sabir
 Abbas Sahhat
 Abdulla Shaig
 Seyid Azim Shirvani
 Ismayil Shykhly
 Manaf Suleymanov

V 
 Molla Panah Vagif
 Bakhtiyar Vahabzadeh
 Aliagha Vahid
 Suleyman Valiyev
 Mirza Shafi Vazeh
 Hashim bey Vazirov
 Najaf bey Vazirov
 Molla Vali Vidadi
 Samad Vurgun

See also 

 Lists of writers
 List of Azerbaijanis

References 

 
Lists of writers by nationality
Writers